Samuel Smith (September 13, 1927 – January 1, 2005) was an American chemist who co-invented Scotchgard with Patsy Sherman while an employee at the 3M company in 1952.

Biography
He was born in New York City and received his B.S. from the City College of New York and his M.S. from the University of Michigan in 1949.  He held 30 U.S. patents and retired from 3M in 1998. He died on January 1, 2005.

Legacy
Smith was an inductee in the National Inventors Hall of Fame.

References

Further reading
Invent Now: Smith

20th-century American chemists
1927 births
2005 deaths
University of Michigan alumni
20th-century American inventors